Alan E. Goldberg (born July 16, 1949) is an American Thoroughbred horse racing trainer. He began his career as a professional trainer in the early 1970s, serving as an apprentice to Walter Kelley from a base at New York's Aqueduct Racetrack. In 1974 he went out on his own and in 1989 trained Safely Kept to American Champion Sprint Horse honors. The following year, Goldberg won the most important race of his career to date when Safely Kept won the Breeders' Cup Sprint.

References
 Alan E. Goldberg at the NTRA

1949 births
Living people
American horse trainers
Sportspeople from Philadelphia